Eastern Gaels GAA (Irish: CLG Gaeil an Oirthir) is a Gaelic Athletic Association club located in Brickens, County Mayo. The club was founded in 1984 in the parish of Bekan drawing its members from  Bekan , Brickeens to the south of the parish and Logboy to the south-east.

The club is a member of the East Division of Mayo GAA and currently competes in the Mayo Junior A Championship. At underage level, Gaels won a Mayo Minor B title in 1993.

The club colours are royal blue with a gold band.

References

External sources
Club Website

Gaelic football clubs in County Mayo
Gaelic games clubs in County Mayo